István Ladóczki (born 11 January 1986 in Budapest) is a Hungarian football player who currently plays for USC Mank.

References 
HLSZ

1986 births
Living people
Footballers from Budapest
Hungarian footballers
Association football midfielders
BFC Siófok players
MTK Budapest FC players
Ceglédi VSE footballers
Hungarian expatriate footballers
Expatriate footballers in Austria
Hungarian expatriate sportspeople in Austria